Bruce McNeil (February 13, 1939 in New York City – May 16, 2019 in Washington, DC) was an American environmental fine arts photographer predominantly known for photographic work which has documented the Washington, DC area waterways. For over two decades his environmental photography has especially focused on documenting the Anacostia River. The Washington Examiner and The Washington Post have dubbed him as “DC River Man” and “Washington’s River Man.” He was the organizer of the Anacostia River School of Photography, "a ragtag group of a half-dozen photographers who either live or work in the neighborhood and are devoted to shooting the river and its environs."

Work 
Mc Neil was a former photographer, lightening and dark room technician, and fabricator of the installations at the McCord Museum in the William Notman Photographic Archives, and assistant to the designer and photographer for the MacDonald Steward Foundation. His work has been exhibited at the Smithsonian Anacostia Community Museum, Sandy Spring Museum, Reginald F. Lewis Museum of Maryland African-American History & Culture, George Washington University Museum, Parish Gallery, Hill Center Galleries at the Old Naval Hospital, and the Anacostia Art Center. McNeil is the recipient of the East of the River Distinguished Artist Award in 2016, and his work is in the permanent collection of the city of Washington, DC.

Press 

In discussing McNeil's photos at the city's Honfleur Gallery in 2012, a Washington Post writer noted that "McNeil’s work centers around the growth of the neighborhood through manipulating images of the Anacostia River." In reviewing the same exhibition, the Post's art critic added that "Bruce McNeil’s “A River Divide — A Tale of Two Cities,” for example, is an impressionistic photograph of light on the Anacostia."

References 

Artists from Washington, D.C.
African-American contemporary artists
American contemporary artists
African-American culture
20th-century African-American people
21st-century African-American people
African-American photographers
Environmental artists
Living people
1939 births